Megingoz (also Meingoz, Megingaud, Megingod, Meingaud, etc.) is a masculine given name of Germanic origin. It is a compound of roots meaning "strength" (cf. OHG magan) and Geats (cf. ON Gautar). Latinizations include Megingaudus, Megimgausus, Maingaudus, Maingauldus, Magingotus, etc., whence forms like Mengold and Meingold.

It may refer to:

Megingoz of Würzburg (d. 783), bishop 753–768
Megingoz, who with his brother Manto, made a major donation to Fulda Abbey in 788
Megingoz (d. after 808), son of Gerold of Vinzgau
Megingoz (fl. 876), count in the Wormsgau, member of the Wilhelminer family
Megingaud, count in the Maiengau, lay abbot of St. Maximin's Abbey, Trier (887–892)
Mengold of Huy (d. 892), count venerated as a saint
Megingoz, abbot of Hersfeld (932–935)
Meingaud, count in the Maingau (965–987) and Lobdengau (987–1002), member of the Conradine family
Megingoz of Guelders (d. c. 1000), count
Megingaud of Eichstätt (d. c. 1015), bishop from 991
Megingaud of Trier (d. 1015), archbishop from 1008
Megingoz of Merseburg, bishop 1126–1140
Meingoz of Lechsgemünd, abbot of Weingarten (1188–1200)

References